Karlīna Miksone (born 21 March 2000) is a Latvian footballer who plays as a midfielder and has appeared for the Latvia women's national team.

Career
Miksone has been capped for the Latvia national team, appearing for the team during the 2019 FIFA Women's World Cup qualifying cycle.

In 2021 signed with Lithuanian FC Gintra. In the end of August 2021, two Latvian players, Anastasija Ročāne and Karlina Miksone, left FC Gintra.

References

External links
 
 
 

2000 births
Living people
Latvian women's footballers
Women's association football defenders
Latvia women's youth international footballers
Latvia women's international footballers